This is a list of the endemic fish species recorded in Papua New Guinea.

Species

See also
Fauna of New Guinea
List of endemic amphibians of Papua New Guinea
List of endemic reptiles of Papua New Guinea
List of birds of Papua New Guinea
List of butterflies of Papua New Guinea
List of mammals of Papua New Guinea

References

FishBase 2004: a global information system on fishes. DVD. WorldFish Center - Philippine Office, Los Banos, Philippines. Published in May 2004.
Catalog of Fishes database, 13 March 2009 version
Eschmeyer, W. N. and R. Fricke, and R. van der Laan (eds). Catalog of Fishes: Genera, Species, References.

 
Papua New Guinea
Fish
Endemic fauna of Papua New Guinea